Bình Long may refer to several places in Vietnam, including:

Bình Long Town, a district-level town of Bình Phước Province
Bình Long, Quảng Ngãi, a commune of Bình Sơn District
Bình Long, An Giang, a commune of Châu Phú District
Bình Long, Cao Bằng, a commune of Hòa An District
Bình Long, Thái Nguyên, a commune of Võ Nhai District
Former Bình Long Province in Southeast Vietnam, now part of Bình Phước Province